The 12th Vietnam Film Festival was held from March 25 to March 28, 1999, in Huế, Vietnam, with the slogan: "For an advanced Vietnam cinema imbued with national identity" (Vietnamese: "Vì một nền điện ảnh Việt Nam tiên tiến đậm đà bản sắc dân tộc").

Event 
The festival that year had its own way of organizing, not bustling but very grandiose, imbued with national identity.

There are 114 films in attendance at the Film Festival (16 feature films, 19 direct-to-video feature films, 17 animated films, 62 documentary/science films). The closing night was a fierce competition between the two films "Hà Nội mùa đông năm 46" and "Ngã ba Đồng Lộc" causing the audience to wait and discuss.

In the end, 3 Golden Lotuses were awarded for categories: feature film (1 film), documentary film (1 film) and direct-to-video documentary (1 film). For the first time, there are awards for actor/actress in supporting roles.

Awards

Feature film

Direct-to-video

Documentary film

Animated film

References 

Vietnam Film Festival
Vietnam Film Festival
1999 in Vietnam